The Cusack Cup is an annual Gaelic Athletic Association club competition between the top Gaelic football clubs in Clare. It is the top division of the Clare Club Football League.

Roll of honour

List of finals

See also
 Clare Senior Football Championship
 Clare Intermediate Football Championship
 Clare Junior A Football Championship
 Clare Under-21 A Football Championship

External links
 Official Clare Website - Cusack Cup

1